Roginska Gorca is a settlement in the Municipality of Podčetrtek in eastern Slovenia. The area around Podčetrtek was traditionally part of the region of Styria. It is now included in the Savinja Statistical Region.

References

External links
Roginska Gorca on Geopedia

Populated places in the Municipality of Podčetrtek